The Song of Pain (Greek: To tragoudi tou ponou) is a 1953 Greek romantic drama film directed by Dimis Dadiras and starring Inta Hristinaki, Malvina Kalvou and Stavros Xenidis.

Cast
 Inta Hristinaki as Lia  
 Malvina Kalvou as Eva  
 Stavros Xenidis 
 Julia Bouka 
 Elias Stamatiou 
 Michalis Nikolopoulos as Alekos 
 Dimitris Dounakis 
 Andreas Georgiou 
 Julianna Stamiri 
 Rania Tsenebi 
 Vera Vasdeki

References

Bibliography
 Aglaïa Mētropoulou & Maria Komnēnou. Hellēnikos kinēmatographos. Ekdoseis Papazēsē, 2006.

External links
 

1953 films
1953 romantic drama films
1950s Greek-language films
Greek romantic drama films
Greek black-and-white films